Akil Akeme Anthony Jumaane Grier (born 15 September 1992) is a former professional footballer who played as a midfielder. Born in England, he represented Saint Kitts and Nevis at international level.

Early and personal life
Born in Birmingham, England, Grier attended Aston Manor Academy.

Club career
Grier played for West Bromwich Albion, Halesowen Town, Östersund, Hednesford Town, Stourbridge, Coleshill Town and Radcliffe.

At Stourbridge he made one Worcestershire Senior Cup appearance in July 2015 as a triallist.

He signed for Coleshill Town in November 2016.

International career
Grier made his international debut for Saint Kitts and Nevis in 2011, and has appeared in FIFA World Cup qualifying matches.

Later life
In February 2019, Grier was sentenced to five years in prison for rape.

References

1992 births
Living people
Citizens of Saint Kitts and Nevis through descent
Saint Kitts and Nevis footballers
Association football midfielders
Östersunds FK players
Saint Kitts and Nevis international footballers
Footballers from Birmingham, West Midlands
English footballers
West Bromwich Albion F.C. players
Halesowen Town F.C. players
Hednesford Town F.C. players
Stourbridge F.C. players
Coleshill Town F.C. players
Radcliffe F.C. players
English expatriate footballers
Saint Kitts and Nevis expatriate footballers
English expatriate sportspeople in Sweden
Saint Kitts and Nevis expatriate sportspeople in Sweden
Expatriate footballers in Sweden
Black British sportspeople
English sportspeople of Saint Kitts and Nevis descent